Bulgaria competed at the 2015 European Games, in Baku, Azerbaijan from 12 to 28 June 2015.

Medalists

Archery

Badminton

 Men's singles – Blagovest Kisyov
 Women's singles – Linda Zechiri; Petya Nedelcheva 
 Men's doubles – Liliyan Mihailov and Mihail Mihailov
 Women's doubles – Stefani Stoeva and Gabriela Stoeva

Boxing

 Men's 49 kg – Tinko Banabakov
 Men's 52 kg – Danail Asenov
 Men's 56 kg – Stefan Ivanov
 Men's 60 kg – Elian Dimitrov
 Men's 64 kg – Ayrin Ismetov
 Men's 69 kg – Simeon Chamov
 Men's 81 kg – Radoslav Panteleev
 Men's 91 kg – Kristian Dimitrov
 Men's +91 kg – Petar Belberov
 Women's 51 kg – Stoika Petrova
 Women's 54 kg – Stanimira Petrova
 Women's 60 kg – Denica Eliseeva

Canoe sprint

 Men's K1 200m – Miroslav Kirchev
 Men's K1 1000m – Miroslav Kirchev
 Women's K1 500m – Berenike Faldum
 Women's K1 5000m – Berenike Faldum
 Men's K2 200m – Galin Georgiev, Nikolai Milev

Cycling

Men's road race – Nikolai Mihaylov, Stefan Hristov

Diving

Men's 1 metre springboard – Dimitar Isaev, Bogomil Koynashki
Men's 3 metre springboard – Dimitar Isaev, Bogomil Koynashki
Men's 5, 7.5, 10 metre platform – Dimitar Isaev
Men's 3 metre synchronized springboard – Dimitar Isaev, Bogomil Koynashki

Fencing

Men's Épée – Deyan Dobrev
Men's Sabre – Atanas Arnaudov

Gymnastics

Acrobatic
 Mixed pairs – Aleks Jekov, Elena Velikova

Artistic
Women's – Ralica Mileva, Albena Zlatkova, Valentina Rashkova
Men's – Aleksandar Batinkov, Martin Angelov, Jordan Aleksandrov

Rhythmic
Bulgaria has qualified one athlete after the performance at the 2013 Rhythmic Gymnastics European Championships.
 Individual – Maria Mateva, Nevyana Vladinova
 Groups – Mihaela Maevska, Reneta Kamberova, Cvetelina Naidenova, Cvetelina Stoyanova, Hristiana Todorova

Trampoline
Bulgaria qualified two athletes based on the results at the 2014 European Trampoline Championships.
 Women's individual – Valeria Jordanova, Simona Ivanova
 Women's synchronized – Valeria Jordanova, Simona Ivanova

Judo

 Men's 60 kg – Yanislav Gerchev
 Men's 81 kg – Ivailo Ivanov
 Women's 57 kg – Ivelina Ilieva

Karate

 Women's 68 kg – Borislava Ganeva

Sambo

Men's 57 kg – Borislav Yanakov
Men's 74 kg – Martin Ivanov
Women's 52 kg – Magdalena Varbanova
Women's 60 kg – Kalina Stefanova
Women's 64 kg – Vanya Ivanova
Women's 68 kg – Gabriela Gigova

Shooting

Men's 10 metre air pistol – Samuil Donkov
Men's 50 metre pistol – Samuil Donkov
Men's 50 metre rifle three positions – Anton Rizov
Men's rifle prone – Anton Rizov
Women's 10 metre air pistol – Maria Grozdeva, Antoaneta Boneva
Women's 25 metre pistol – Maria Grozdeva, Antoaneta Boneva
Mixed air 50 metre pistol – Samuil Donkov, Antoaneta Boneva

Swimming

Men's 50 metre breaststroke – Matyu Cenkov
Men's 100 metre breaststroke – Matyu Cenkov
Men's 200 metre breaststroke – Matyu Cenkov
Men's 200 metre individual medley – Kaloyan Nikolov
Men's 400 metre individual medley – Kaloyan Nikolov
Women's 50 metre freestyle – Diana Petkova
Women's 100 metre freestyle – Diana Petkova
Women's 50 metre backstroke – Boyana Tomova
Women's 100 metre backstroke – Diana Petkova, Boyana Tomova
Women's 200 metre backstroke – Boyana Tomova
Women's 200 metre individual medley – Diana Petkova

Synchronised swimming

Duet – Mihaela Peeva, Maria Kirkova

Table tennis

Women's singles – Anelia Karova

Taekwondo

Men's 68 kg – Vladimir Dalakliev
Men's 80 kg – Teodor Georgiev

Triathlon

Men's triathlon – Emil Stoinev
Women's triathlon – Hrista Stoineva

Volleyball

Indoor

Men's – Georgi Bratoev, Rozalin Penchev, Martin Bojilov, Svetoslav Gocev, Danail Milushev, Branimir Grozdanov, Dobromir Dimitrov, Valentin Bratoev, Jani Jelyazkov, Todor Aleksiev, Nikolai Nikolov, Borislav Apostolov, Vencislav Ragin, Petar Karakashiev
Women's – Diana Nenova, Nasya Dimitrova, Lora Kitipova, Dobryana Rabadjieva, Gabriela Koeva, Gergana Dimitrova, Hristina Ruseva, Miroslava Paskova, Silvana Chausheva, Maria Filipova, Jana Todorova, Elica Vasileva, Mira Todorova, Emiliq Nikolova

Beach

Women's – Irena Mishonova, Svetla Angelova

Wrestling

Men's events

Freestyle

57 kg – Vladimir Dubov
61 kg – Radoslav Velikov
65 kg – Borislav Novachkov
70 kg – Miroslav Kirov
74 kg – Kiril Terziev
86 kg – Georgi Sredkov
97 kg – Dragomir Stoichev
125 kg – Dimitar Kumchev

Greco-Roman

59 kg – Aleksandar Kostadinov
66 kg – Konstantin Stas
71 kg – Svilen Kostadinov
75 kg – Yavor Yanakiev
80 kg – Daniel Aleksandrov
85 kg – Nikolai Bairyakov
98 kg – Vladislav Metodiev
130 kg – Miloslav Metodiev

Women's events

Freestyle

48 kg – Elica Yankova
53 kg – Pepa Dimitrova
55 kg – Evelina Nikolova
58 kg – Mimi Hristova
60 kg – Taibe Yusein
63 kg – Elina Vaseva
69 kg – Djanan Manolova
75 kg – Stanka Zlateva

References

Nations at the 2015 European Games
European Games
2015